The soil moisture zone is the depth of soil from which plant roots extract water.

References
 

Soil
Irrigation
Water conservation